Caracal is a genus in the subfamily Felinae of the family Felidae. It was proposed by John Edward Gray in 1843 who described a skin from the Cape of Good Hope in the collection of the Natural History Museum, London. Historically, it was considered to be a monotypic genus, consisting of only the type species: the caracal C. caracal.

Taxonomy
Phylogenetic analysis revealed that caracal, African golden cat (C. aurata) and serval (Leptailurus serval) are genetically closely related forming a genetic lineage that diverged from the common ancestor of the Felidae . This taxonomic classification is used in the IUCN Red List for the African golden cat. It is used as a synonym for the serval.

References

External links

 
Mammal genera
Taxa named by John Edward Gray
Felines